Soviče ( or ) is a settlement in the Haloze Hills above the right bank of the Drava River in eastern Slovenia. It belongs to the Municipality of Videm. The area traditionally belonged to the Styria region. It is now included in the Drava Statistical Region.

References

External links
Soviče on Geopedia

Populated places in the Municipality of Videm